Crown advocate is a title used in some former British colonies (and until recently in Britain) for a government prosecutor.  In former British Colonies and certain British extraterritorial courts the title is (or was) used by the senior government advocate. Until recently, in Britain the title is used for entry-level prosecution counsel employed by the Crown Prosecution Service.

Great Britain

In the United Kingdom, the role of a crown advocate (now called a crown prosecutor) is to analyse, review, prepare and present a wide range of cases in the Crown Court and the Court of Appeal, including as a junior advocate in the more serious and complex cases. Crown advocates will be expected to have an up-to-date knowledge of all criminal offences and will maintain a high volume of casework, which will include the review of more serious and complex cases.

There are also senior and principal crown advocates.

British Supreme Court for China and Japan

The position of Crown Advocate was created in the British Supreme Court for China and Japan in 1878.   The first holder of the position was Nicholas John Hannen.  The position was similar to the position of an Attorney General in a colony. The Crown Advocate was not a full-time employee of the Foreign Office but received payment for acting as Crown Advocate. The Crown Advocate was allowed to accept cases from private clients that did not conflict with his role as Crown Advocate.

Malta
The position of Crown Advocate was created in 1839 to replace the office of Attorney General.  The position was abolished in 1922 and taken over by the Treasury Counsel. In 1936, the role of Treasury Counsel was taken over by the newly re-created office of Attorney General.

Australia

New South Wales

The Crown Advocate is appointed under the provisions of the Crown Advocate Act, 1979 (Act No.59).

The Crown Advocate advises the Attorney General, particularly on questions arising under the criminal law, and appears for the NSW Government in criminal proceedings of special significance  Under the Act the Crown Advocate assists the Solicitor General in respect of the exercise or discharge by the Solicitor General of any powers, authorities, duties or functions delegated by the Attorney General under section 4 of the Solicitor General Act, 1969.

South Australia

The Crown Advocate is responsible for the conduct of the State’s major civil and commercial litigation, and will act as senior trial counsel in more complex matters.

Tasmania

From 1973 to 1986 the senior government prosecutor in Tasmania was known as the Crown Advocate.  The title was changed to Director of Public Prosecutions in 1986.

See also
King's Advocate
Crown counsel

References

Advocates
Law Officers of the Crown in the United Kingdom
Region-specific legal occupations